Mario Deslauriers (born 23 February 1965) is a Canadian equestrian. He competed at the Summer Olympics in 1984 and 1988 before returning after a 33 years gap, to the 2021-held 2020 games.

References

External links
 

1965 births
Living people
Canadian male equestrians
Olympic equestrians of Canada
Equestrians at the 1984 Summer Olympics
Equestrians at the 1988 Summer Olympics
Equestrians at the 2019 Pan American Games
Sportspeople from Quebec
Pan American Games competitors for Canada
Equestrians at the 2020 Summer Olympics
20th-century Canadian people
21st-century Canadian people